Zoltan Hospodar (born 8 March 1933) is a Romanian water polo player. He competed at the 1952 Summer Olympics and the 1956 Summer Olympics.

References

1933 births
Living people
Romanian male water polo players
Olympic water polo players of Romania
Water polo players at the 1952 Summer Olympics
Water polo players at the 1956 Summer Olympics
Sportspeople from Arad, Romania